Marc Santo is a writer, film and television producer, and director. His work includes off beat travel guides, music videos, documentaries and profiles on notable chefs, artists and musicians for clients that include MTV, Tribeca Productions and Wieden & Kennedy.

Career

Santo began working in the entertainment industry as a college student doing street marketing and social promotions for record labels like Matador Records, Giant Step Recordings and Satellite Records. After graduation he was offered a gig helping David Johansen of the New York Dolls make music videos.

During the late 90s and early 2000s he lived in a notable creative building in New York's East Village, whose other residents included Arik Roper, Elizabeth Peyton, Darren Aronofsky, and members of the band Interpol.

Revel in New York and Revel in Portland

In 2009 Marc Santo and Scott Newman co-founded a series of yearly New York guidebooks called Revel in New York, which were distributed to guests at The Standard Hotel and featured contributions from photographer Michael Halsband, designer Jim Walrod, and food personalities Eddie Huang and Joshua Ozersky.

Revel in New York also had accompanying videos that aired on Boing Boing, The New York Times, and Gothamist. They later became a formal series through a partnership with the New York Post, and later CBS.

The mini-documentaries and interviews featured marginalized "characters" like pigeon fanciers, sex workers, and performance artists as well as notable creative New Yorkers like filmmaker Jerry Schatzberg, punk icon Ari Up, chef Marcus Samuelson, artist Tina Barney and others accompanied by quirky suggestions on places to visit in New York such as where to buy gold teeth and where to find wild parrots in the city.

In 2012, Santo and Newman partnered with Wieden & Kennedy Entertainment co-founder Janice Grube and the help of Portlandia to create Revel in Portland, a Portland, Oregon edition of the books that featured Nike shoe designer Tinker Hatfield, filmmaker Lance Bangs, Chromatics and others.

The Water Dancer 

The Water Dancer is an Iconoclast style documentary campaign for Quicksilver and Roxy Swimwear co-produced by Marc Santo and Michael Halsband. The series starred Australian-born 6-time World Champion Surfer, Stephanie Gilmore as she traveled to New York City to meet up with professional dancers Noemie LaFrance and Tiler Peck to make the connection between surfing and dancing.

Documentary Profile Series 

In 2014, Santo was hired by a production company in the UK to produce and direct a number of series, which aired online on The Huffington Post. The series included WORK, which followed bands such as Moon Duo, NOTS, and A Place to Bury Strangers, and UNBUILT, which profiled architects Vito Acconci and Gaetano Pesce as they described their favorite unbuilt projects.

Emperor Go! 

In 2012, Santo founded the production company, Emperor Go!. He produced artwork for Kool Keith's FeatureMagnetic and the feature-length documentary, Built on Narrow Land about Bauhaus architecture on Cape Cod, which featured an original score by Josephine Wiggs of The Breeders.

Emperor Go! later teamed up with experimental technology company Super A-OK to produce 3D fashion shoots using Super A-OK's custom version of array camera technology. Using this technique, he produced shoots for fashion brand Opening Ceremony and celebrity musician portraits for the 2016 I Heart Radio Awards and The David Bowie Tribute concert.

Emperor Go! and Super A-OK continued working together to create BEST TIME – a 3D portrait series on musicians that include The Flaming Lips, Perry Farrell, Kyp Malone, The Pixies, Jakob Dylan, Sean Lennon, 21 Savage and others.

Uncle No Rules 
In 2018, Santo teamed up with artist Richie Brown and Chris Parker to create and co-direct The Uncle No Rules Show, a mock public access children’s show starring Marky Ramone, Prince Rama, Kool Keith, Muffinhead, Sucklord and a number of NYC Club Kids.

Film Threat described the show as, “…hilarious insanity… and one of the most original pieces of absurdist comedy...” It was nominated for a Webby Award in 2019.

References

American male writers
American directors
American film producers
Living people
Year of birth missing (living people)